The list of Diamond Jubilee Honours 2012 was released on 13 September 2012 and made appointments and promotions within the Royal Victorian Order (and awards of the Royal Victorian Medal) to recognise contributions to the celebration of the Diamond Jubilee of Elizabeth II in 2012.  The Royal Victorian Order is a dynastic order of knighthood recognising distinguished personal service to the Sovereign, and remains in the personal gift of the monarch.

Knights Grand Cross of the Royal Victorian Order (GCVO)
 Sir Philip Alan Reid KCVO, Keeper of the Privy Purse and Treasurer to the Queen

Knights Commander of the Royal Victorian Order (KCVO)
 Michael Vernon Lockett CVO, Chief Executive of the Thames Diamond Jubilee Foundation
 Robert Michael James Gascoyne-Cecil, 7th Marquess of Salisbury, PC DL, Chairman of the Thames Diamond Jubilee Foundation
 John Damian Spurling OBE, for services to charity

Commanders of the Royal Victorian Order (CVO)
 Frances Ann MacLeod, Head of the Diamond Jubilee Unit in the Department of Culture, Media and Sport
 Lieutenant Colonel Anthony Charles Richards LVO, Deputy Master of the Royal Household and Equerry to the Queen
 Simon Howe Brooks-Ward LVO OBE TD, Chief Executive of the Diamond Jubilee Pageant and Producer of the Royal Windsor Horse Show
 Robert Gerrard Williams LVO, Producer of the Diamond Jubilee Concert

Lieutenants of the Royal Victorian Order (LVO)
 Paul Robert Edgar Double, Remembrancer in the City of London
 Adrian Anthony Joseph Evans, Pageant Master of the Thames Diamond Jubilee Pageant
 Mary Angela Kelly MVO, Personal Assistant and Senior Dresser to the Queen
 Douglas Robert King, Assistant Private Secretary to the Queen
 Dr Jill Nicola Nicholls, Chairman of the Trustees of the Woodland Trust, for Jubilee Woods
 Timothy Miles Owen MVO, Chairman of the Licensing, Operating, Safety and Planning Group at Westminster City Council
 Bruno Mark Peek OBE MVO, Pageant Master of the Diamond Jubilee Beacons
 Terence Alan Pendry MVO BEM, Stud Groom and Manager of the Royal Mews at Windsor Castle
 Colette Benedicta Geraldine Saunders, Assistant Press Secretary to the Queen
 Philip Benedict Weston, BBC Executive Director of the Diamond Jubilee Weekend
 Paul Kevin Whybrew MVO RVM, the Queen's Page

Members of the Royal Victorian Order (MVO)
 Sonia Bonici, Senior Correspondence Officer in the Royal Household's Private Secretary's Office
 John Creighton Bridcut, maker of the film A Jubilee Tribute to the Queen by the Prince of Wales
 David Phillimore Clifford, Company Secretary and Treasurer of the Thames Diamond Jubilee Foundation
 Captain Jules Cope, Captain of the Motor Yacht Leander
 Captain Ross Geoffrey Ferris OBE, Royal Fleet Auxiliary, Master of the Royal Fleet Auxiliary Fort Rosalie
 Alexander Garty, Transport Manager in the Royal Mews
 Warrant Officer Class 1 William Daran Gillduff Mott OBE, Garrison Sergeant Major for the London District
 Chief Superintendent Julia Pendry, Metropolitan Police
 Commander David George Phillips, Royal Navy, Chief Harbour Master at the Port of London Authority
 Sergeant Jonathan Lee Reeves, Metropolitan Police
 Alexander John Scully, State Invitations Secretary at the Lord Chamberlain's Office
 Peter John Stewart, Big Jubilee Lunch (Campaigns Director at the Eden Project)
 Mark Walenty Wasilewski, Park Manager at the Royal Parks of St James's Park and Green Park
 Rita Carnelia Frances Broe, Big Jubilee Lunch
 Francis Damian Byrne, Project Manager of the Royal Row Barge Gloriana

Royal Victorian Medal (RVM) (Silver)
 Annie Meldrum, for personal services
 Brian Todhunter, restoration of Her Majesty's Yacht Britannia's Royal Barge and Escort Boats

See also
 2012 Birthday Honours, which includes Diamond Jubilee Honours in New Zealand

References
 The 2012 Diamond Jubilee Honours List, royal.gov.uk, 13 September 2012
 Queen honours 'Big Paul' in Diamond Jubilee honours list, London Evening Standard,  September 2012 

Diamond Jubilee Honours 2012
2012 awards in the United Kingdom
Diamond Jubilee Honours
Honours